Bert Sprotte (9 December 1870 – 30 December 1949) was a German actor. He appeared in more than 70 American films between 1918 and 1938. He was born in Chemnitz, Saxony, and died in Los Angeles, California.

Selected filmography

 Selfish Yates (1918)
 The Border Wireless (1918)
 Breed of Men (1919)
 The Shepherd of the Hills (1919)
 Two Moons (1920)
 The Golden Trail (1920)
 Jes' Call Me Jim (1920)
Below the Deadline (1921)
 The Night Horsemen (1921)
 Guile of Women (1921)
 Trailin' (1921)
 The Blazing Trail (1921)
 For Big Stakes (1922)
 A Question of Honor (1922)
 Conquering the Woman (1922)
 Silver Spurs (1922)
 The Fighting Streak (1922)
 Thelma (1922)
 The Prisoner (1923)
 The Purple Dawn (1923)
 Trimmed in Scarlet (1923)
 Snowdrift (1923)
 The Miracle Baby (1923)
 Soul of the Beast (1923)
 Rosita (1923)
 Wild Bill Hickok (1923)
 Singer Jim McKee (1924)
 Little Robinson Crusoe (1924)
 His Hour (1924)
 Confessions of a Queen (1925)
 The White Desert (1925)
 The Human Tornado (1925)
 Why Women Love (1925)
 Ace of Spades (1925)
 The Lady in Ermine (1927)
 The Stolen Bride (1927)
 Wild Geese (1927)
 Life of an Actress (1927)
 The Fighting Hombre (1927)
 The Private Life of Helen of Troy (1927)
 Pass the Gravy (1928)
 A Royal Romance (1930)
 Demon of the Sea (1931)
 A Passport to Hell (1932)
 Song of the Eagle (1933)
 It Could Happen to You (1937)

References

External links

1870 births
1949 deaths
German male film actors
German male silent film actors
20th-century German male actors
German expatriates in the United States